Robin Söderling was the defending champion, but decided not to participate this year. Andy Murray, who made his debut appearance at the tournament, beat Alexandr Dolgopolov 6–1, 6–3 to take the title.

Seeds

Draw

Finals

Top half

Bottom half

Qualifying

Seeds

Qualifiers

Draw

First qualifier

Second qualifier

Third qualifier

Fourth qualifier

References 
Main Draw
Qualifying Draw

Men's Singles
Brisbane International - Singles